The Fannin Range is a Canadian mountain range lying between the Seymour River and Indian Arm/Indian River in the Pacific Ranges of the Coast Mountains of British Columbia, Canada. The southern portion of the range terminates near the city of Vancouver and as such is very highly traveled.

It contains mountains such as Mount Seymour, Mount Bishop and Mount Elsay, and is home to Mount Seymour Provincial Park.

References

North Shore Mountains